Vance Winkworth Amory (22 May 1949 – 2 April 2022) was a Saint Kitts and Nevis politician and cricketer. He served two stints as Premier of Nevis, from 1992 to 2006 and from 2013 to 2017, and served as the Minister of Sports in the Nevis Island Administration. He founded and led the Concerned Citizens' Movement. The airport in Nevis, Vance W. Amory International Airport, bears his name.

Early life and career
Amory was born on 22 May 1949 in Rawlins Village. He received his elementary, primary and secondary school education in Nevis. He has been an active member of a local church in Nevis since childhood.

Amory was known for his fondness for cricket. An opening batsman, he played first-class cricket for the Combined Islands and the Leeward Islands from 1969 to 1981. His highest score was 88, for Leeward Islands against Windward Islands in 1977-78, when he helped to ensure a draw after Leeward Islands trailed by 167 runs on the first innings. In his last match he captained Leeward Islands against the touring English team in March 1981, scoring 37 and 56. He suffered injuries during his career, including a broken nose that caused him to be carried off the field.

Amory excelled academically, obtaining passes in 5 out of available 7 GCE 'O' level subjects at Charlestown Secondary School. He subsequently achieved his 'A' grade levels in St. Kitts, and went on to the University of the West Indies at Cave Hill Campus, Barbados, where he obtained a Bachelor of Arts degree. Then he returned home in 1973 to teach students at Charlestown Secondary School.

He taught at Gingerland Secondary School from 1974 to 1977, including a period of six months as acting headmaster. Then, at the age of 28, he became the youngest headmaster of Charlestown Secondary School. He took an institution that was lagging seriously behind and almost single-handedly restored acceptable grades and credibility. The transition from GCE 'O' levels to CXC and the newly introduced sports programs were among some of the challenges that he overcame, despite opposition. He assisted greatly with the education improvement of thousands during his days as teacher and principal.

Between 1981 and 1983 Amory was manager of the St. Kitts, Nevis and Anguilla National Bank, during which time he aided many individuals in obtaining well needed financing. That Bank was relatively new on Nevis and had its early difficulties. Nevis residents were very cautious in doing business with the institution and Amory set his mind to change this. The bank thereafter experienced healthy financial growth. He was also instrumental in overseeing the purchase of the land on which National Bank sits today.

Politics
In 1983, Amory applied for and successfully received a position in the finance department of the Nevis Island Government. He was then promoted to Permanent Secretary in Finance, under the premiership of Dr. Simeon Daniel. It was from that position that Amory learned the ins and outs of governance. He took study leave in September 1986 to further his education at University of the Virgin Islands, St. Croix campus. He resigned his position in December of that year and reported that he wanted to dedicate himself for the betterment of Nevis.

In 1987 he organised a political party, the Concerned Citizens Movement. In 1992, he became Premier of Nevis and served until 2006. His transformation of the face of Nevis can be seen in many facets. He played a substantial role in securing the funding for the construction of the airport. There were numerous regulatory obstacles strewn in path of the airport development and numerous delays by the Basseterre Government (in Saint Kitts) in extending a loan guarantee. His commitment to the successful completion of the project is one reason that the airport bears his name.  In 1996, he announced plans for Nevis to secede from St. Kitts, but the resulting 1998 referendum failed to reach the necessary two-thirds majority.

Amory served a second term from 2013 to 2017.

Death 
Amory died of cancer in a London hospital on 2 April 2022, at the age of 72.

References

|-

1949 births
2022 deaths
Premiers of Nevis
Sports ministers of Saint Kitts and Nevis
Saint Kitts and Nevis sportsperson-politicians
University of the West Indies alumni
Nevisian cricketers
Combined Islands cricketers
Leeward Islands cricketers
People from Saint George Gingerland Parish
Concerned Citizens' Movement politicians